Arthur S. Iberall (June 12, 1918 – December 8, 2002) was an American physicist/hydrodynamicist and engineer who pioneered homeokinetics, the physics of complex, self-organizing systems. He was the originator of the concept of lines of non-extension on the human body which was used to create workable space suits.

Biography
Arthur S. Iberall was born in New York City. His mother, Anna Katz, immigrated to the United States from Kaunas, Lithuania.  His father, Benjamin Iberall, immigrated from Warsaw, Poland.  He had one sibling, psychologist Rosalind Rothman.  He married Helene Rubenstein (1913-2016) in 1940, and they had four daughters, Eleanora I. Robbins, Penni I. Rubin, Thea Iberall, and Valerie I. O'Connor.

Iberall studied at City College of New York, where he received a BS in physics in 1940 and then continued by studying mechanical engineering.  From 1942-1945, he worked on an MS under George Gamow and Edward Teller at George Washington University.

From 1941 to 1953, Iberall worked at the National Bureau of Standards in Washington, DC. In 1953, he left government work and worked in the private sector at ARO (1954) and the Rand Development Corporation (1954-1964). In 1964, he started General Technical Services with Samuel Z. Cardon in Upper Darby, Pennsylvania. In 1976, he was awarded an honorary Doctor of Science from Ohio State University in recognition of his achievements in interdisciplinary scientific research.
At the invitation of F. Eugene Yates, Iberall joined the UCLA Crump Institute for Medical Engineering. From 1981 to 1985, Iberall was a Crump Visiting Scholar where he did research and taught. In 1991, he retired and started publishing with Cri-de-Coeur Press.

Iberall died in 2002 from congestive heart failure.

Work
Under the leadership of William G. Brombacher at the National Bureau of Standards, Iberall worked on instrument theory, safety equipment, and measurement problems such as the physics of the atmosphere. At that time, the US Navy and US Air Force were creating aircraft that could travel further and further into the upper atmosphere.  Pilots were being affected at the higher altitudes, which led to funding of studies of human physiology in order to understand how the body responds to high G forces and reduced oxygen.  He also worked on the development of a new breathing apparatus that led to undersea scuba innovations.

At the Rand Development Corporation, Iberall worked on engineering and physics problems. Along with chemist Samuel Z. Cardon, he solved technical problems for businesses such as Cleveland Pneumatic Tool Co. Westinghouse, Sherwin-Williams, Illinois Tool Works, Ohio Brass Co., and Industrial Fasteners Institute.  They also worked on technical issues such as the analysis of waters of the US for the United States Department of Health, Education, and Welfare, engineering for military applications for the US Army and high altitude research and full pressure altitude suits for the USAF.

At General Technical Services, Iberall and Cardon solved problems such as physiological responses of mammals to high pressure and flow in arteries for NASA, water pollution for the Public Health Service. For US Army commands, they did research on oscillators, clothing design, technical forecasting, planning, systems science applications, cybernetics and computer applications, autonomous systems, and survival of complex systems. For the Office of Naval Research, they worked on inertial guidance systems, hydrodynamics equations, fluid dynamics. Other work included dosage radiation factors for the Atomic Energy Commission, systems science applications for the United States Department of Transportation, complex systems interactions for the  National Institute of Aging, and mobile pressure suits for the US Air Force.

At the UCLA Crump Institute, Iberall joined the Complex Systems Group which attracted professors from many universities and federal agencies to learn how to incorporate systems science into diverse fields.  He also taught courses on the thermodynamics of living systems for chemical engineering students, which was sponsored by the Marshak Colloquium of UCLA.

Contributions

Space Suits and Lines of Non-Extension

In 1947, Iberall began work at NBS on pressure suits for the US Air Force and the National Advisory Committee for Aeronautics.  They recognized that astronauts had to be protected from expansive forces. Iberall developed one of the first space suits to solve this problem; his first approximation was to use netting (linknet) to help the suit maintain form. The ultimate solution came from an analysis of the lines of non-extension (LONE), i.e. the parts of the body that did not move much so the suit did not need special treatment there.  Astronaut Scott Crossfield flew the X-15 in this suit, as did astronauts on Gemini missions between 1962-64. The Federal Government required that business interests take over further development and production for commercial applications, so the David Clark Company won the contract for space suit design and eventually took design in another direction. Years later, Dava Newman at Massachusetts Institute of Technology has her students following up on LONE as a design for the next generation of space suits.

The design of a space suit needed a deep understanding of physiology.  As Iberall was studying this problem, his oldest daughter got polio and he went searching for the most innovative ideas to save the functioning of her afflicted leg.  He found Rene Cailliet, a newly minted MD at the Kabat-Kaiser Institute who taught Iberall physiology.  Later, as a Professor of Medicine at UCLA, Cailliet went on to become the author of the widely known series of textbooks on musculoskeletal medicine, and some of his earliest ideas thereby became incorporated into space suit design.

Iberall also learned physiology from his mentor, neurophysiologist and cybernetician Warren S. McCulloch.  As they worked on biophysical research for the NASA exobiology program analyzing the dynamics of mammalian physiological processes, initial ideas that would become homeokinetics began to emerge.  In 1967, they performed a complete systems analysis of the daily activities that constitute human behavior.

Homeokinetics—The Physics of Complex Systems

Homeokinetics is the study of complex systems—universes, galaxies, social systems, people, or even systems that seem as simple as gases. The entire universe is modelled as atomistic-like units bound in interactive ensembles that form systems, level by level in a nested hierarchy. Homeokinetics treats all complex systems on an equal footing, both animate and inanimate, providing them with a common viewpoint. The complexity in studying how they work is reduced by the emergence of common languages for all complex systems.

Life, birth, and death of complex systems are bound in hierarchical processes that have both side-side and in-out components. In common with the simpler counterparts, complex systems exhibit rest phases, smooth or creeping flows, turbulence, and chaotic phases; they alternate in storminess and placidity, as well as in their intermittence and changeability.

While working at NBS on the problem of humans in high altitude space, Iberall was led into more and more interdisciplinary research using kinetic theory to develop instrumentation covering the major variables of pressure, temperature, density, and flow, both steady state and dynamically changing. Working on the applied problems of the aircraft industry, meteorology, and high altitude military led to his studies of high speed so-called speed-of-sound rates of flow, to more than one phase flow (e.g., gases and liquids), two or more stream flow theory, metastability, solid state metals research both for steady state loads and dynamic (or changing) states. This irrevocably led to the problem of turbulence as distinguished from laminar flow. That also led to the full Navier-Stokes equation set, a nonlinear high ordered mathematical physical construct that still leaves much to be desired in solution. From a homeokinetic perspective, these Navier-Stokes equations connect the lower level atomistic-like components with the upper level collective processes in the material-energetic substance.

It was through these interdisciplinary explorations that Iberall’s definition of complexity and its complexity measure began to emerge. Iberall and Harry Soodak realized they were observing an area that physics has neglected, that of complex systems with their very long internal factory day delays. These systems are associated with nested hierarchy and with an extensive range of time scale processes. It was such connections, referred to as both up-down or in-out connections (as nested hierarchy) and side-side or flatland physics among atomistic-like components (as heterarchy) that became the hallmark of homeokinetic problems. By 1975, they began to describe these the problems of nature, life, humankind, mind, and society.

A homeokinetic approach to complex systems has been applied to understanding life, ecological psychology, mind, anthropology, geology, law, motor control, bioenergetics, healing modalities, and political science.

It has also been applied to social physics where a homeokinetics analysis shows that one must account for flow variables such as the flow of energy, of materials, of action, reproduction rate, and value-in-exchange. Iberall's conjectures on life and mind have been used as a springboard to develop theories of mental activity and action.

Congressional Briefings
1960—Problems of Education and Science, US Senate Subcommittee on Government
1962—Scientific Needs of the USA, US Senate Subcommittee on Government
1963—Science as a Profession in the USA, US Senate Subcommittee on Government
1977—Scientific Needs of the USA, US Senate Subcommittee on Government

Patents
 Iberall, A.S., Inertial sensing system for use in navigation and guidance, 1971 
 Iberall, A.S., Adjustable helmet face mask, 1972 
 Iberall, A.S., Blood pressure measuring mechanism, 1972

Honors
 American Society for Cybernetics, past technical vice president
 Instrument Society of America, past committee member
 Biomedical Engineering Society, Alza Distinguished Lecturer (1975)
 International Society for the Comparative Study of Civilizations, past executive board member
 Fellow of the American Society of Mechanical Engineers
 Doctor of Science (honorary), Ohio State University (1976) 
 Arthur S. Iberall Distinguished Lecture Series on Life and the Sciences of Complexity at University of Connecticut at Storrs (2003–present)

Publications
Iberall authored 8 books, 95 peer-reviewed articles, and 49 scientific conference extended abstracts. He also wrote a series of booklets: "CP2" (Commentaries, Physical and Philosophical) published by Cri-de-Coeur Press from 1991-2002 discussing subjects as varied as problems with evolution, primer on social physics, and how systems and the mind work. A complete list of his published papers is online.

Books
 1970. 
 1972. 
 1973.  
 1973. 
 1974. 
 1976. 
 1993. 
 2016.

Selected articles

Iberall, A.S. and W.S. McCulloch. "The organizing principle of complex living systems. J. Basic Engr., ASME 290-294, 1969.
Iberall, A.S., Use of lines of non extension. ASME Publication, 1969.
Iberall, A.S. "On the general dynamics of systems, General Systems Yearbook XV:7-13, 1970.

Iberall, A.S. A fantasia on the design of a mammal. In: A. Iberall, A. Guyton (eds.). Regulation and Control in Physiological Systems, ISA, Pittsburgh, 1973.
Iberall, A.S. On the neurophysiological basis of war. General Systems Yearbook, XVIII:l61, 1973.
Iberall, A., Guyton, A. (eds). Regulation and Control in Physiological Systems. Proc. Joint IFAC, Am. Physiol. Soc., Intern Union Physiol. Sci. Conference, Rochester, NY, Instru. Soc. Amer., Pittsburgh, 1973.
Yates, F.E. and A.S. Iberall. Temporal and hierarchical organization in biosystems. In: J. Urquhart and F.E. Yates (eds.) Temporal Aspects of Therapeutics, p. 17-34 (54???), Plenum, N.Y., 1973.
Schindler, A.M. and A.S. Iberall. The need for a kinetics for biological transport. Biophy. J. 13:804, 1973.
Iberall, A.S. Flow and pressure regulation in the cardiovascular system. In: W. Vannah and H. Wayland (eds.). Flow, Its Measurement and Control In Science and Industry, Instr. Soc. of America, Pittsburgh, PA., 1(3), 1974.
Iberall, A.S. On a thermodynamic theory of history. General Systems Yearbook XIX:201, 1974.

Iberall, A.S., H. Soodak and C. Arensberg. Homeokinetic physics of societies - A new discipline: Autonomous groups, cultures, polities. In: H. Reul, Ghista, D., and Rau, G. (eds.). Perspectives in Biomechanics, Vol. I, Part A. Harwood Academic Press, N.Y., pp. 433–527, 1980.

Wilkinson, D. and A. S. Iberall. "From systems physics to world politics: Invitation to an enterprise. In: M. Karns (ed.), Persistent Patterns and Emergent Structures in a Waning Century. Praeger, NY, 1986.
Iberall, A. and Soodak, H.: A physics for complex systems. In: F. Yates, (ed.), Self-Organizing Systems, pp. 499–520. Plenum Press, NY 1987, p 499-520.
Iberall, A. A physics for studies of civilizations. In: F.E. Yates, (ed.), Self-Organizing Systems: The Emergence of Order. New York: Plenum Press, 1987, p 521-540.
Iberall, A.S. On rivers. In: F.E. Yates, (ed.), Self-Organizing Systems: The Emergence of Order. New York: Plenum Press, 1987, p 33-52.
Soodak, H., Iberall, A. Thermodynamics and complex systems. In: F.E. Yates, (ed.). Self-Organizing Systems: The Emergence of Order. New York: Plenum Press, 1987, p 459-469.
Iberall, A. and Wilkinson, D. Dynamic foundations for complex social systems. In: G. Modelski, (ed.), Exploring Long Cycles. Lynne Rienner Publishers, Boulder, CO 1987.

Iberall, A. How to run a society, CP2: Commentaries, Physical and Philosophic, Laguna Hills, CA, 1.1-1.4, 1990; 2.1-2.4, 1991.

References

External links
www.homeokinetics.org
commons.trincoll.edu/homeokinetics

20th-century American physicists
1918 births
2002 deaths
American physicists